HD 129685 is a single star in the southern constellation of Centaurus. It is also known by its Bayer designation c2 Centauri, while HD 129685 is the star's identifier in the Henry Draper catalogue. This object has a white hue and is faintly visible to the naked eye with an apparent visual magnitude of +4.92. It is located at a distance of approximately 231 light years from the Sun based on parallax, and it has an absolute magnitude of 0.83. The star is drifting closer with a radial velocity of around −5 km/s.

Two different stellar classifications have been reported for this star. A class of A0Vn assigned by Abt and Morrell (1995) indicates it is a rapidly-rotating A-type main-sequence star, while a type of A0IVnn, according to Gray and Garrison (1987), suggests it is a somewhat more evolved subgiant star. It is around 239 million years old with 2.1 times the mass of the Sun, and is reported to be rotating close to its break-up velocity. The star is radiating 45 times the luminosity of the Sun from its photosphere at an effective temperature of 9,323 K.

References

A-type main-sequence stars
Centaurus (constellation)
Centauri, c2
Durchmusterung objects
129685
072104
5489
A-type subgiants